Mathu Yam Dawasa (Some Day in the Future) is a 2001 Sri Lankan Sinhala crime drama film directed and produced by Dharmasena Pathiraja. It stars Saumya Liyanage and Wasantha Moragoda in lead roles along with Jayani Senanayake and Radha De Mel. Music composed by Premasiri Kemadasa. It is the 1165th Sri Lankan film in the Sinhala cinema.

The film also introduces Rukshana Miskin, Jayani Senanayake and D.B. Gangodathenna to the silver screen. The world premier of the film was held at Singapore International Film Festival, 2002. It also entered 4th Cinefan Festival, New Delhi, 2002 as Sri Lankan selection. The film was also selected to ‘Asiatica Film Mediate" in Rome, Italy to represent Sri Lanka.

Plot

Cast
 Saumya Liyanage as Dhammika
 Wasantha Moragoda as Lionel
 Jayani Senanayake
 Radha De Mel		
 D.B. Gangodathenna		
 Bandula Vithanage
 Rukshana Miskin	
 Mahinda Basnayake
 Lionel Wickrama
 Sarath Dikkumbura
 Kapila Sigera
 Layanal Wikramasinghe
 Shanthi Bhanusha

References

External links
 

2001 films
2000s Sinhala-language films